Henry David Jones (born 8 March 1989) is an English cricketer.  Jones is a right-handed batsman who bowls right-arm medium pace.  He was born in Kingston-upon-Thames, Greater London and was educated at Caterham School.

While studying for his degree at Loughborough University, Jones made his first-class debut for Loughborough UCCE against Gloucestershire in 2008.  He made four further appearances for the team, the last of which came against Hampshire in 2009.  In his five first-class matches, Jones scored 8 runs at an average of 2.66, with a high score of 6 not out.  With the ball, he took 6 wickets at a bowling average of 57.33, with best figures of 4/57.

References

External links
Henry Jones at ESPNcricinfo
Henry Jones at CricketArchive

1989 births
Living people
Cricketers from Kingston upon Thames
People educated at Caterham School
Alumni of Loughborough University
English cricketers
Loughborough MCCU cricketers